Cobra is a double album featuring a live and studio performance of John Zorn's improvisational game piece, Cobra recorded in 1985 and 1986 and released on the Hathut label in 1987.  Subsequent recordings of the piece were released on Knitting Factory (John Zorn's Cobra: Live at the Knitting Factory (1992)), Avant (John Zorn's Cobra: Tokyo Operations '94 (1994)) and Zorn's own label Tzadik Records, (Cobra: John Zorn's Game Pieces Volume 2)) in 2002.

Reception
AllMusic contains two disparate reviews of the album, the first by Brian Olewnick awarded the album 3 stars stating "one is left with the nagging (and correct) sense of something crucial being missed. As a document in Zorn's career, Cobra is essential. As a purely musical experience, it is, quite unfortunately, less so".

The second review of the 2002 CD reissue by Steve Loewy rated the album 4½ stars calling it "A masterpiece of eclecticism... all presented in Zorn's wickedly demented style, which tends toward pastiche but fascinates with its energy and variety. For Zorn enthusiasts, this is a must-have release."

Track listing
Disc one (Studio Version)

Disc two (Live Version)

All compositions by John Zorn

Note: Disc one: 1, 9, 11, 13, 14 and Disc two: 3 are extra tracks not available on the original vinyl edition.

Personnel
Disc one (Studio Version)
Jim Staley – trombone
Carol Emanuel – harp
Zeena Parkins – harp
Bill Frisell – guitar
Elliott Sharp – doubleneck guitar/bass, soprano, voice
Arto Lindsay – guitar, voice
Anthony Coleman – piano, harpsichord, celeste, Yamaha organ
Wayne Horvitz – piano, Hammond organ, celeste, DX7
David Weinstein – Mirage sampling keyboards, celeste
Guy Klucevsek – accordion
Bob James – tapes
Christian Marclay – turntables
Bobby Previte – percussion
John Zorn – prompter
Recorded at Radio City Studios, New York City on May 9, 1986
Disc two (Live Version)
J.A. Deane – trombone synthesizer, electronics
Bill Frisell – guitar
Elliott Sharp – doubleneck guitar/bass, voice
Anthony Coleman – piano, pipe organ, Yamaha organ
Wayne Horvitz – piano, DX7
David Weinstein – Mirage sampling keyboards
Guy Klucevsek – accordion
Bob James – tapes
Christian Marclay – turntables
Bobby Previte – drum machine
John Zorn – prompter
Recorded live at Rensselaer Polytechnic Institute on October 21, 1985 by WRPI

References

1985 albums
Cobra (Zorn) albums
Albums produced by John Zorn
Hathut Records albums